Oliver Marach and Michal Mertiňák were the defending champions, but did not compete together that year.
Marach partnered with Łukasz Kubot, but lost in the final to František Čermák and Mertiňák.
Mertiňák partnered with Čermák and won the final 4–6, 6–4, [10–7].

Seeds

Draw

Draw

External links
Draw

Abierto Mexicano Telcel - Men's Doubles
2009 Abierto Mexicano Telcel